High Speed is a pinball simulation video game developed by Rare for the Nintendo Entertainment System, and published by Tradewest in 1991. High Speed employs the game engine that Rare previously developed for Pin*Bot (1990).

Rare adapted the game from the pinball machine High Speed, which was designed by Steve Ritchie and released by Williams Electronics in 1986. The following year, Williams Electronics was renamed WMS Industries prior to its initial public offering.

In 1995, Williams Entertainment, a division of WMS Industries, published a sequel, The Getaway, for the Game Boy, based on Ritchie's pinball machine The Getaway: High Speed II.

Gameplay
Similar to Pin*Bot, the NES version of High Speed plays identical to the pinball machine of the same name, but with a few new elements added in, such as collecting safes and helicopters that allow the player to play bonus levels, where lots more points can be scored.  The player can also collect money bags of the same name, and has to avoid enemies that will destroy the ball or the flippers, such as bombs and tumbleweeds.

The object of the main game (as in the pinball machine) is to activate the police chase mode by hitting the nine stoplight targets, changing the main stoplight on the ramp from green to yellow, and then to red.  Once the light is red, shooting the ball up the ramp starts the police chase mode.  Shooting the ball up the ramp again escapes the police and starts multi-ball (where three balls are in play), and shooting one of the balls up the ramp a third time wins the hideout jackpot (beginning at 250,000 points and growing until it is collected).

References

1991 video games
Nintendo Entertainment System games
Nintendo Entertainment System-only games
Pinball video games
Rare (company) games
Tradewest games
Video games scored by David Wise
Video games developed in the United Kingdom